The Bowling competition at the 2010 Central American and Caribbean Games was held in Mayagüez, Puerto Rico.

The tournament was scheduled to be held from 19–25 July at the Bolera Caribe in Ponce.

Medal summary

Men's events

Women's events

Mixed events

External links
Official Website

Events at the 2010 Central American and Caribbean Games
July 2010 sports events in North America
Central American and Caribbean Games
2010